Mario Abner Rivera Rivera (born 22 January 1978), better known as Mario VI is a Puerto Rican reggaeton recording artist. 

Born in Canóvanas, Puerto Rico, Rivera worked in the business side of the industry before becoming a recording artist. He founded the record label VI Music. He was for a long time the primary chorist of the reggaeton artist Don Omar. Now he works for Spanish Broadcasting System (SBS) for a radio station La Nueva 94 (WOND 94.7FM  WODA 94.1FM) in Puerto Rico, main urban radio station. He is co-host to a daily radio show (M-F) at 3PM-7PM with El Coyote, however "El Goldo y La Pelua" are in the first position at that time. 

He is also a successful comedian, songwriter, radio personality and recently (2015) became a father with current wife Michelle.

Singles
 "El Brindis" (2007)
 "Dos Amantes, Dos Amigos" (feat. La Sista) (2008)

Featured Singles
 "Ella Sabe Que Se Ve Bien" (Gallego feat. Mario VI) (2006)

Album appearances
 Los Bandoleros (2005)
 Los Bandoleros Reloaded (2006)
 Gargolas: The Next Generation (2006)
 Tributo Urbano a Héctor Lavoe (2007)
 El Pentágono (2007)
 El Pentágono: The Return (2008)
 Los Bravos Relouded (2008)
 Alex Gargolas Presenta: Los Brothers (2008)
 DJ Joe: The Comeback (2017)

References

1978 births
Living people
People from Canóvanas, Puerto Rico
Puerto Rican reggaeton musicians